During the 1998–99 English football season, Queens Park Rangers F.C. competed in the Football League First Division.

Season summary
After a poor start to the 1998–99 season, Harford was sacked in September and replaced by Gerry Francis, returning for his second spell as QPR manager. After another disappointing season, Francis managed to somehow keep them clear of the relegation zone on goals scored at the expense of Bury, with QPR finishing in 20th place.

Final league table

Results
Queens Park Rangers' score comes first

Legend

Football League First Division

FA Cup

League Cup

Players

First-team squad
Squad at end of season

Left club during the season

References

Notes

Queens Park Rangers F.C. seasons
Queens Park Rangers